The Bryce Jordan Center is a 15,261-seat multi-purpose arena in University Park, Pennsylvania, United States, on the University Park campus of the Pennsylvania State University. The arena opened in 1996 and is the largest such venue between Philadelphia and Pittsburgh. It replaced Rec Hall as the home to the Nittany Lions men's and women's basketball teams, the Pride of the Lions Pep Band, and its student section, Legion of Blue. It also plays host to events such as concerts, circuses, and commencement ceremonies for colleges within the university. The arena is named after former Penn State University president Bryce Jordan, who was instrumental in acquiring funding needed to build it. The arena is associated with the Arena Network, a marketing and scheduling group of 38 arenas.

Location and layout
The arena is located across the street from Beaver Stadium on Curtin Road, on the eastern part of the campus. This part of campus is home to many of the school's athletic facilities, including the recently built Medlar Field at Lubrano Park baseball facility, Pegula Ice Arena,  and Jeffrey Field soccer stadium. There is a large electronic display outside the arena which provides advertisements for future events.

Operations
The Jordan Center is owned by Penn State University and operated through its Auxiliary & Business Services Unit.

Notable events
It hosts numerous concerts and World Wrestling Entertainment events, including RAW.

Parts of Aerosmith's 1998 live album, A Little South of Sanity, were recorded at the Jordan Center. Lead singer Steven Tyler can be heard yelling "State College" out to the audience in order to rile them up during "Love in an Elevator".

The music video for The Backstreet Boys' 2000 hit, "The One", was filmed at the arena

Britney Spears played a concert in 2001 as part of her Dream Within a Dream Tour. Some performances were taped with a new technology, at the time, called First-person shooter engine and were released as bonus videos in her video game "Britney's Dance Beat", for PlayStation 2.

The arena played host to the politically motivated Vote for Change Tour on October 1, 2004, featuring performances by My Morning Jacket, Jurassic 5, Ben Harper & The Innocent Criminals, and The Dave Matthews Band.

In March 2006, the arena hosted first and second rounds of the NCAA Women's Division I Basketball Championship. The arena also hosts the Pennsylvania Interscholastic Athletic Association (PIAA) Basketball Championships on a yearly basis.

In 2007, the Penn State IFC/Panhellenic Dance Marathon, commonly known as THON, was moved to the Jordan Center. The event, designed to raise money to fight pediatric cancer, raises millions of dollars every year.

On October 13, 2008, it played host to Change Rocks: A Concert to Benefit Obama, among guests playing included The Allman Brothers Band and Bob Weir, Phil Lesh, Mickey Hart and Bill Kreutzmann, all four of whom were members of The Grateful Dead.

On October 20, 2018, Metallica set the attendance record with a crowd of 15,588 people.

See also
 List of NCAA Division I basketball arenas

References

External links
 
 Bryce Jordan Center at GoPSUSports.com 

College basketball venues in the United States
Sports venues in Pennsylvania
Music venues in Pennsylvania
Indoor arenas in Pennsylvania
Penn State Nittany Lions and Lady Lions basketball venues
Pennsylvania State University campus
1996 establishments in Pennsylvania
Sports venues completed in 1996